Colegio Alejandro Guillot is a private school with three campuses in Tlalpan, Mexico City.

Its kindergarten and primary school campus is in Colonia Ex Hacienda Coapa. Its middle school campus and its high school campus are both in Colonia Nueva Oriental Coapa.

References

External links
 Colegio Alejandro Guillot 

Tlalpan
High schools in Mexico City